Guillermo Martínez Ayala (born 15 March 1995) is a Mexican professional footballer who plays as a forward for Liga MX club Puebla.

Honours
Guadalajara
Liga MX: Clausura 2017
Copa MX: Clausura 2017

Mexico U20
CONCACAF U-20 Championship: 2015

Individual
Liga de Expansión MX Golden Boot (Shared): Guardianes 2020

References

External links
 
  
 
 

1995 births
Living people
Mexican footballers
Association football forwards
C.F. Pachuca players
Lobos BUAP footballers
C.D. Guadalajara footballers
Mineros de Zacatecas players
Cafetaleros de Chiapas footballers
Liga MX players
Ascenso MX players
Liga Premier de México players
Footballers from Guanajuato
People from Celaya
Mexico under-20 international footballers
2015 CONCACAF U-20 Championship players